Brownsmead is an unincorporated community, on a distributary of the Columbia River called Saspal Slough, in Clatsop County, Oregon, United States. Previously known as Brody, it was named after W.G. Brown, a Portland engineer involved in land reclamation in the area. There was a post office in Brownsmead from 1919 to 1975, located in the Brownsmead General Store.

Historic photos of the Brownsmead fish station, located where Davis Creek feeds into Blind Slough, reveal docked gillnetting boats. One such boat is shown in the boat hoist, resting above the water by several feet on the dock.

Brownsmead is the northernmost settlement in the state of Oregon.

References

Unincorporated communities in Clatsop County, Oregon
1919 establishments in Oregon
Unincorporated communities in Oregon